The Fittipaldi machine gun is a recoil-operated machine gun designed by Rafael Fittipaldi (an Italian immigrant to Argentina) and patented as USPTO number 1,099,245, of June 9, 1914.

Description 
The Fittipaldi machine gun uses the barrel of the Argentinian Mauser Model 1891 rifle as well as its bolt, the latter adapted for rectilinear action. It was fed by a non-disintegrating belt and used a traditional tripod as mount. A water jacket covered the entire length of its barrel, giving it an external appearance similar to the Lewis Gun.

History 
The Fittipaldi machine gun was not adopted by the Argentine Army. Little is known about its history or performance, including why it was not adopted. The prototype, dated to 1912, is on display in Room XVI "Freedom Walk" from the Museum of Arms of the Nation, Buenos Aires, Argentina.

References

7.65mm machine guns
Machine guns of Argentina
Early machine guns